Sabha University is a public university in the southern city of Sabha, Libya, with campuses in Sabha, Awbari, Murzuq, Brak, and Ghat.

The beginning of Sebha University was in 1976 when the Faculty of Education had been founded as a branch of the University of Tripoli and nucleus for Sebha University later. Sebha University was founded as an independent university in 1983 and included in the beginning both of Faculties of Education and Sciences. Then the Faculties of Medicine, Agriculture, Science of Engineering, Technology, Economics and Accounting were added to Sebha University. So the number of university faculties reached to nineteen faculties located in various areas in the South. The number of students studying in Sebha University until 2016 was (25726) students

Faculties 
Sebha awards Bachelor's degrees and Master's degrees. There are nine faculties, or schools, at Sebha University:
 Agriculture
 Arts
 Economics and Accountancy
 Engineering Science and Technology 
 Law
 Medicine
 Physical Education
 Sciences
 Education Awbari
 Education Brak
 Pharmacy
 Education Ghat
 Information Technology

References

External links 
 Official website

1983 establishments in Libya
Educational institutions established in 1983
Universities in Libya
University
University